(born 21 August 1986, in Sapporo) is a Japanese gymnast. He was a member of the 2008 Olympic team that won the silver medal. He was the 2nd best Japanese gymnast in the qualifying round and 5th overall but was replaced in the all around final by Hiroyuki Tomita.

References

1986 births
Living people
Japanese male artistic gymnasts
Olympic gymnasts of Japan
Gymnasts at the 2008 Summer Olympics
Olympic silver medalists for Japan
Sportspeople from Sapporo
Olympic medalists in gymnastics
Medalists at the 2008 Summer Olympics
21st-century Japanese people